Jettingen station is a railway stop in the market municipality of Jettingen-Scheppach, in Bavaria, Germany. The train station is located in the district of Jettingen and on the standard gauge railroad line Ulm-Augsburg of Deutsche Bahn.

Services 
As of the December 2020 timetable change, the following services stop at Jettingen:

 : Hourly service between Ulm Hauptbahnhof and München Hauptbahnhof

References

External links 

 
 Jettingen station – Deutsche Bahn

Railway stations in Bavaria